Angel is a 1966 experimental animated short directed by Derek May and produced by Guy Glover for the National Film Board of Canada. 

In it, a young man, a girl and a dog play in the snow and attempt to fly.

The film was shot against a snowscape and then stripped of grayscale to create a pure white background. It features music by Leonard Cohen, performed by The Stormy Clovers.

Awards
 19th Canadian Film Awards, Toronto: First Prize, Arts and Experimental, 1967
 Vancouver International Film Festival, Vancouver: Honourable Mention, 1967
 Columbus International Film & Animation Festival, Columbus, Ohio: Chris Certificate, Graphic Arts, 1967
 Festival of Canadian Films - Montreal International Film Festival, Montreal: Special Mention, Short Films, 1967

References

Works cited

External links
 Watch Angel at NFB.ca
 
 

1966 films
National Film Board of Canada animated short films
Quebec films
Canadian Screen Award-winning films
Leonard Cohen
Canadian avant-garde and experimental short films
1960s animated short films
1966 animated films
Films directed by Derek May
Films produced by Guy Glover
Canadian animated short films
1960s Canadian films